Following is a list of members of Delta Gamma collegiate women's fraternity.

Business

Education

Entertainment

News

Government and public service

Law

Politicians

Sports

Writers and publishing

See also 

 List of Delta Gamma chapters

References 

Lists of members of United States student societies
Delta Gamma